Ćurkovica may refer to:
 Ćurkovica (Surdulica), a village in the Surdulica municipality of Pčinja District
 Ćurkovica (Vranje), a village in the Vranje municipality of Pčinja District